Semněvice is a municipality and village in Domažlice District in the Plzeň Region of the Czech Republic. It has about 200 inhabitants.

Administrative parts
Villages of Pocinovice and Šlovice are administrative parts of Semněvice.

References

Villages in Domažlice District